was an old province of Japan in the area that is today the western part of Saitama Prefecture.

History
According to text in the Sendai Kuji Hongi (Kujiki), there was an area called Chichibu Province during the reign of Emperor Sujin.  Since ancient times, Chichibu-jinja has been the main Shinto shrine in the area.

In the Edo period, a pilgrimage route linked together 34 sacred sites of the old Chichibu Province.

See also
 Musashi Province
 Chichibu District, Saitama
Thirteen Buddhas of Chichibu

References

Kuni no miyatsuko
History of Saitama Prefecture